The third edition of the EAFF Women's Football Championship was held in 2010, with a preliminary qualification tournament held in 2009.

Rounds

Semi-final competition
The semi-final competition was held in Tainan County (now part of Tainan City), Taiwan from 22–30 August 2009.  The winner of the group advanced to the Final Competition.

Awards

Final competition

The final competition was held in Tokyo, Japan in February 2010. The North Korean women's team withdrew from the tournament in January 2010, and were replaced by the Chinese Taipei side, the runners-up from the semi-final tournament.

Goals
2 goals

 Han Duan
 Mana Iwabuchi
 Lee Jang-mi
 Yoo Young-a

1 goals

 Ma Xiaoxu
 Pang Fengyue
 Yuan Fan
 Yukari Kinga
 Shinobu Ohno
 Megumi Takase
 Mami Yamaguchi
 Jeon Ga-eul
 Ji So-yun

Awards

See also
 List of sporting events in Taiwan

References

External links
 Official website of East Asian Football Championship 2010 Semi-Final Competition
 Official website of East Asian Football Championship 2010 Final Competition
		

East
East
2010
2010
2010
2010 in Japanese women's football
2010 in Chinese football
2010 in South Korean football
2010 in Taiwanese football